Dorothy Lewis is a former female English international lawn bowler.

Bowls career
Lewis won a National Championship in 1985 when she won the pairs title with Pip Green.

She represented England in the fours event, at the 1990 Commonwealth Games in Auckland, New Zealand.

References

Living people
English female bowls players
Bowls players at the 1990 Commonwealth Games
Year of birth missing (living people)
Commonwealth Games competitors for England